The Sichuan tit (Poecile weigoldicus) is a species of bird in the tit family Paridae. It is found in central China.

This species was formerly treated as a subspecies of the willow tit (Poecile montanus). It was promoted to species status based on a genetic analysis published in 2002. It is monotypic: no subspecies are recognised.

References 

Sichuan tit
Birds of Central China
Sichuan tit
Sichuan tit
Sichuan tit